The Governor of Maroodi Jeex is the chief executive of the Somaliland region of Maroodi Jeex, leading the region's executive branch. Governors of the regions is appointed to the office by the Somaliland president. The current governor of Maroodi Jeex is Mahamed Cilmi Ahmed Mahamuud.

See also

Maroodi Jeex
Politics of Somaliland

References

External links

Governors of Somaliland
Governors of Maroodi Jeex